Tai or TAI may refer to:

Arts and entertainment
Tai (comics) a fictional Marvel Comics supervillain
Tai Fraiser, a fictional character in the 1995 film Clueless
Tai Kamiya, a fictional character in Digimon

Businesses and organisations
 Avianca El Salvador, an airline, ICAO code TAI
 The Australia Institute, a left-wing think tank
 Transports Aériens Intercontinentaux (TAI), a defunct French airline
 Turkish Aerospace Industries (TAI)

Ethnic groups and languages
Tai peoples
Tai languages
Tai language (New Guinea)

People
Tai (given name), including a list of people with the name
Tai (surname), including a list of people with the name
Dai (surname), a Chinese surname also spelled Tai, including a list of people with the name
Tai, the artist name of poet and painter Kambara Yasushi (1899–1997)

Places
Tai (city), a former settlement in China during the Xia dynasty
Tai, Ardabil, Iran
Tai, Lorestan, Iran
Tai, Rivers, Nigeria
Taï, Ivory Coast
Lake Tai, in the Yangtze Delta, China
Mount Tai, in Shandong, China
Taiz International Airport, Yemen, IATA airport code TAI

Other uses
 Tai (elephant) (1968-2021), an Asian elephant that had appeared in several films
 International Atomic Time (TAI, from the French: temps atomique international) 
 Red seabream (Pagrus major), known in Japan as Tai, a fish 
 Trifluoromethylaminoindane (TAI), a psychoactive drug

See also

Dai (disambiguation) (Chinese Tai is sometimes romanized as Dai)
Tay (disambiguation)
Thai (disambiguation)

Taiwan, a state in East Asia
Tayy, an Arab tribe

Language and nationality disambiguation pages